Diocese of San Jose may refer to:
 Roman Catholic Archdiocese of San José de Costa Rica
 Roman Catholic Diocese of San José del Guaviare (Colombia)
 Roman Catholic Diocese of San Jose de Antique (Philippines)
 Roman Catholic Diocese of San Jose in Nueva Ecija (Philippines)
 Roman Catholic Diocese of San José de Mayo (Uruguay)
 Roman Catholic Diocese of San Jose in California (United States)

See also
 Apostolic Vicariate of San José de Amazonas (Peru)
 Apostolic Vicariate of San Jose in Mindoro (Philippines)